Daniel Benzali (born January 20, 1946) is a Brazilian-American stage, television and film actor.

Early life
Benzali was born in Rio de Janeiro, Brazil, the son of Lee, a cook, and Carlo Benzali, a salesman who had also been an actor in Brazilian theatre and Yiddish theatre. His family are Brazilian Jews. Daniel Benzali is the middle son of three. The family moved to the United States in 1953, and the boys were raised in Brooklyn, New York City.

Career

Theatre
Benzali began his acting career as a theatre actor, including the Royal Shakespeare Company in Great Britain. His first performance was in Holiday at The Old Vic alongside Mary Steenburgen and Malcolm McDowell.

He also played musical theater, including a portrayal of Juan Perón in the London cast of Evita. He played faded film director Max von Mayerling, alongside Patti LuPone, in the original (1993) cast of Andrew Lloyd Webber's Sunset Boulevard. Benzali also appeared on Broadway in Fiddler on the Roof and other smaller productions.

In 2019 Benzali was slated to play the lead role in the London staging of Bianca Bagatourian's The Time Of Our Lies. He withdrew on opening night due to unforeseen circumstances.

Television and feature films
In 1985 he was cast in the James Bond film A View to a Kill as W. G. Howe, the Californian director of Oil and Mines, based at San Francisco City Hall. The character was shot dead in his office there by  Max Zorin (played by Christopher Walken).

Subsequently, he began making guest-starring roles on television series such as Strong Medicine, Star Trek: The Next Generation, The X-Files, and in recurring roles in NYPD Blue and L.A. Law. NYPD Blue and L.A. Law creator Steven Bochco was so impressed with Benzali's performances that Bochco later cast him in the lead role of his 1995 series Murder One, playing attorney Ted Hoffman. For his performance, Benzali was nominated for a Golden Globe Award. The series was not especially successful (though highly regarded later), and Benzali left after its first season. Bochco later revealed that he fired Benzali because he refused to leave his home before he completed his morning bowel movement and was perpetually late to the set.

Benzali's stage performance in Holiday at The Old Vic so impressed director Anthony Page that Page cast him opposite Teri Garr in the Hallmark Hall of Fame TV movie adaptation of Pack of Lies, a play by English writer Hugh Whitemore. Benzali also starred in the TV series The Agency and appeared in feature films including By Dawn's Early Light (1990), Murder at 1600 (1997), The Grey Zone (2001), and Suckers (2001). He appeared in the post-apocalyptic CBS series Jericho as the enigmatic former Department of Homeland Security director Thomas Valente. After that, he starred in the FX television series Nip/Tuck as Dr. Griffin.

In December 2010, Benzali joined ABC's General Hospital. Benzali played a character named Theodore Hoffman, a reference to his role on the mid-1990s television series Murder One.

Personal life

Benzali married Worcestershire potter Lynda Medwell in 1979 while acting in Great Britain. They were married six years.

Benzali and fiancée Kim Cattrall had a three year relationship. Benzali (then 51) and Cattrall broke up in 1997, just prior to her role in Sex and the City (1998–2004).

Benzali has been living in London and divides his time between England and the United States.

Filmography

References

External links

Male actors from New York City
American male film actors
American male stage actors
American male musical theatre actors
American male television actors
American people of Brazilian-Jewish descent
Brazilian Ashkenazi Jews
Brazilian emigrants to the United States
Jewish American male actors
Jewish Brazilian male actors
People from Brooklyn
Male actors from Rio de Janeiro (city)
1946 births
Living people
21st-century American Jews
Brazilian actors
Brazilian American
American Jews